Mazzaro Italian Market (also Mazzaro's Italian Market) is an Italian cuisine fine food market located in St. Petersburg, Florida. It hosts wine tastings and book signings. It is known for its cheeses, olives, deli sandwiches, bakery items, handmade pastas and pre-made dishes.

References

External links
 

Companies based in St. Petersburg, Florida
Italian-American culture in Florida
Tourist attractions in St. Petersburg, Florida
Food markets in the United States